Abjit is a former village in the Balakan Rayon of Azerbaijan. The village formed part of the municipality of Qaysa.

References 

Populated places in Balakan District